The Charlottetown Royals were a professional men's Intermediate "A" ice hockey team playing out of Prince Edward Island, Canada. NHL players who have played for the Royals were Errol Thompson and Wes Trainor.

References

Ice hockey teams in Prince Edward Island
Sport in Charlottetown